Haripurwa  is a Municipality in Sarlahi District in the Janakpur Zone of south-eastern Nepal. At the time of the 2011 Nepal census it had a population of 15,798 people living in 2,593 individual households. it is made by the combination of villages like basantpur, haripurba,mirchaiya,zingarwa.

External links
UN map of the municipalities of Sarlahi  District

References

Populated places in Sarlahi District
Nepal municipalities established in 2017
Municipalities in Madhesh Province